Atamelang is a township in Tswaing Local Municipality in the North West province of South Africa. The township is in the former country of Bophutatswana, some 22 km north-west of Delareyville.

Atamelang was established set up by the then apartheid government in 1978.

Demographics 
Its population in 2011 was 5,906. Of the total Black African made up 98.9%, Coloured (mixed race) 1.4% and Indian/Asian 1.2%.

References  

Populated places in the Tswaing Local Municipality